Pseudomicronia fraterna is a moth of the family Uraniidae. It is found in Sri Lanka.

References

Moths of Asia
Uraniidae